Björn Carlsson (born 1954) is a Swedish former footballer. Carlsson made 22 Allsvenskan appearances for Djurgården between 1976 and 1978 and scored 1 goal. He started off his career at Nyköpings BIS.

References

Swedish footballers
Allsvenskan players
Djurgårdens IF Fotboll players
Association footballers not categorized by position
1954 births
Living people